Srimanthudu is a 1971 Indian Telugu-language drama film produced by G. Radhakrishna Murthy and A. Ramachandra Rao under the Viswa Bharathi Productions banner and directed by K. Pratyagatma. It stars Akkineni Nageswara Rao and Jamuna, with music composed by T. Chalapathi Rao. Kamal Haasan worked under Thangappan as his dance assistant in this film.

Plot 
The film begins with two good friends Sekharam (Gummadi) a wealthy man and Chalapathi (J. L. Narasimha Rao) an intelligent drunkard who accommodates in Sekharam 's outhouse. They also fix up their children Raja (Master Aadinarayana) and Radha's (Baby Sridevi) alliance. Once Chalapathi discovers Mica in a particular area, with Sekharam's help he starts business when Sekharam invests his entire property and they succeed. At that time, Chalapathi dies in an accident. Exploiting the situation, Chalapathi's devious and materialistic sister Kaasulamma (Suryakantham) and her innocent husband Hanumanthu (Ramana Reddy) along with  Manager Kishtappa (Raavi Kondala Rao) ploy by taking charge as guardians to minor Raja and throws Sekharam into debt. Due to this, he goes bankrupt, loses his wife Lakshmi (Jhansi) and leaves the town. Years roll by, Kaasulamma raises Raja (Akkineni Nageswara Rao) as debaucher and takes authority over the property. At present, Sekharam & Radha (Jamuna) return when Radha becomes distressed to see Raja in that condition. So, Radha cleverly makes the acquaintance and reforms him. Right now, Raja understands his aunt's deceptiveness, also finds out atrocities played by Kishtappa in the factory and eradicates them. Simultaneously, Raja decides to marry Radha, to which Kaasulamma opposes, but he proceeds. So, Kaasulamma and Kishtappa conspire and eliminate him in an accident. After a few days, shockingly, a rude man who resembles Raja arrives when everyone claims himself as a duplicate including Radha. But he resides with proofs and starts teasing the schemers. At last, it is revealed that Raja has survived Kaasulamma's ruse with the help of his wise uncle Hanumanthu. Finally, the movie ends on a happy note with the marriage of Raja & Radha.

Cast 
Akkineni Nageswara Rao as Raja
Jamuna as Radha
Gummadi as Sekharam
Ramana Reddy as Hanumanthu
Raja Babu as Babji
Raavi Kondala Rao as Kishtappa
Sakshi Ranga Rao as Guruji
J. L. Narasimha Rao as Chalapathi
Suryakantham as Kaasulamma
Jhansi as Lakshmi
Master Aadinarayana as Young Raja
Baby Sridevi as Young Radha

Soundtrack 

Music composed by T. Chalapathi Rao.

References

External links 
 

1971 films
Indian drama films
Films scored by T. Chalapathi Rao
1970s Telugu-language films
Films directed by Kotayya Pratyagatma